The 1998–99 FIBA Korać Cup was the 28th edition of FIBA's Korać Cup basketball competition. The Spanish FC Barcelona defeated the Spanish Adecco Estudiantes in the final. This was FC Barcelona's second time winning the title following a victory in 1987.

Team allocation 

The labels in the parentheses show how each team qualified for the place of its starting round:

 1st, 2nd, 3rd, etc.: League position after Playoffs
 WC: Wild card

Qualifying round

|}

Source: fibaeurope.com

Regular season

Sources:

Round of 32

|}

Round of 16 

|}

Quarterfinals

|}

Semifinals

|}

Finals

|}

See also 

 1998–99 FIBA Euroleague
 1998–99 Saporta Cup

References

External links 

1998–99
1998–99 in European basketball